American singer Christina Aguilera's recording career began in 1994 at the age of thirteen, following the cancellation of The Mickey Mouse Club. Between 1994 and 1995, Aguilera recorded a series of songs, which were eventually released as a demo album under the name Just Be Free in 2001, after her career had already begun. Aguilera then moved to Japan and recorded a duet with Japanese singer Keizo Nakanishi titled "All I Wanna Do" for Nakanishi's sixth studio album Spinning (1997). Aguilera then returned to the US and, in 1998, signed a contract with RCA Records. She was selected to perform the song "Reflection" for the soundtrack of the 1998 Disney animated feature Mulan. Throughout the rest of 1998 and early 1999, Aguilera resumed recording for her debut album.

Christina Aguilera would be released on August 24, 1999. It was preceded by the US number-one lead single, "Genie in a Bottle". RCA Records was determined to solidify Aguilera as the next pop sensation which lead to the album the album featuring the distinct teen pop sound of the late 1990s. Aside from "Genie In a Bottle", Christina Aguilera also features "What a Girl Wants", which was originally recorded by French singer Ophélie Winter and a cover of All-4-One's "I Turn to You" and "Come On Over Baby (All I Want Is You)". "What a Girl Wants" became Aguilera's second consecutive number-one single in the US, with "Come On Over Baby (All I Want Is You) enjoying similar success. "I Turn To You peaked at number three on the US Billboard Hot 100 chart. Aguilera continued her teen idol image into 2000, when she released her first Spanish-language project, Mi Reflejo, which consists of mostly Spanish-language versions of songs from Aguilera's debut, and a Christmas album titled My Kind of Christmas, which is a compilation of covers of Christmas standards and one original dance-pop-oriented song.

Aguilera was displeased with her sound and image, calling it inauthentic, resulting to the termination of her manager Steve Kurtz's services. eventually Irving Azoff was hired as her new manager and Aguilera began to take control of her image. In 2001, Aguilera alongside Pink, Mýa and Lil' Kim recorded a rendition of LaBelle's 1974 single "Lady Marmalade" produced by Missy Elliot and Rockwilder. The song was selected to be featured in the soundtrack of Baz Luhrman's Moulin Rouge! (2001). The video portrayed Aguilera in a more mature and sexual image than previously. RCA Records originally hesitated to let Aguilera record the track, due to it being "too urban" but she managed to record the song anyway.

Stripped was released on October 22, 2002. Aguilera took creative control on the album and co-wrote most of the songs. The record incorporates elements of a wide variety of genres, including soul, hip hop, rock, and Latin. The lead single, "Dirrty", faced controversy for its sexual nature. "Beautiful" is a piano ballad written by Lina Perry, and received acclaim for its positive message. Other singles included "Fighter", "Can't Hold Us Down", and "The Voice Within". Lyrically, Stripped addresses topics like sexism, sexual liberation, self-esteem and the physical violence she endured as a child. Stripped received mixed reviews from contemporary critics, but has become one of Aguilera's most acclaimed albums.

In 2006, Aguilera released her fifth studio album, Back to Basics, which is inspired by 1920s-1940s jazz, blues, and soul, and yielded three international singles: "Ain't No Other Man", "Hurt", and "Candyman". Four years later, Aguilera released her sixth studio album, Bionic, which sees influences from electronic music, and included the international singles "Not Myself Tonight" and "You Lost Me". Her seventh studio release, Lotus (2012), is primarily a pop record with dance-pop and rock styles. Aguilera's eighth studio album, Liberation, followed in 2018 and received critical acclaim.

In 2022, Aguilera released her ninth studio album, a Spanish-language record titled Aguilera in three parts, titled La Fuerza, La Tormenta and La Luz.

Released songs

Unreleased songs

See also
Christina Aguilera discography

Notes

References

 
Aguilera, Christina